St. Jacobi Church, Wuhu is a Protestant church located in Jinghu District, Wuhu, Anhui, China.

History 
St. Jacobi Church's history stretches back to 1883, founded by the Episcopal Church.

In June 2011, the church was moved  eastward. The church was inscribed as a municipal cultural relic preservation organ in October 2001 and a provincial cultural relic preservation organ in December 2012, respectively.

Architecture 

References

Further reading 
 

Churches in Anhui
1883 establishments in China
Churches completed in 1883
Tourist attractions in Nanjing
Protestant churches in China
Gothic Revival church buildings in China